Tan Sri Datuk Seri Panglima Joseph Pairin Kitingan (born 17 August 1940) is a Malaysian politician who served as the 7th Chief Minister of Sabah from April 1985 to March 1994 and Member of Parliament (MP) for Keningau from August 1986 to May 2018. He is founding President of the United Sabah Party (PBS) and brother of Jeffrey Kitingan, the Deputy Chief Minister II and State Minister of Agriculture and Fisheries of Sabah and President of Homeland Solidarity Party (STAR) as well as uncle of Maximus Ongkili, the Minister in the Prime Minister's Department in charge of Sabah and Sarawak affairs and President of PBS.

Personal life 
Pairin was born in Papar but his hometown is in the interior district of Tambunan, to a retired police officer, Datuk Francis Xavier Kitingan Sobunau (1895–1996) and his second wife, Datin Lucia Laimah Imbayan (1913–2011), natives of the said district who hailed from two villages, namely Karanaan, which was located just behind Tambunan town centre as well as Nambayan, located on the road leading to the main Interior Division town of Keningau.
He attended La Salle Secondary School, an all-boys Catholic missionary school, located in Tanjung Aru, Kota Kinabalu (but prior to that, he attended a few other Catholic missionary schools namely St. David's Primary School, Toboh from primary 1 to 3, St. Theresa's Primary School, Tondulu, from primary 4 to 6 and St. Martin's Secondary School, Tampasak, from forms 1 until 3, all located in his hometown of Tambunan as well as St. Joseph's Secondary School, Papar during forms 4 to lower 6, owing to his father's job postings in the Royal Malaysia Police). He later won a Colombo Plan scholarship and went on to read law at the University of Adelaide and upon completing his studies, he came back to Sabah to work as a State Counsel with the Sabah Legal Department and was later made a Deputy Public Prosecutor. Subsequently, he practised law with a local legal firm. Pairin is a Catholic, married to Genevieve Lee, a retired teacher of mixed Hakka Chinese descent. They have two sons, Alexander and Daniel, who are both trained lawyers. His brother Jeffrey Gapari Kitingan is also a politician, a former vice-president of Parti Keadilan Rakyat (PKR) after being a former member of prior political parties such as Parti Bersatu Sabah (PBS), Parti Bersatu Rakyat Sabah (PBRS), Parti Angkatan Keadilan Rakyat (AKAR), United Pasokmomogun Kadazandusun Murut Organisation (UPKO), Parti Keadilan Rakyat (PKR) and also the State Reform Party (STAR) and finally became the leader of his own party, Homeland Solidarity Party (STAR Sabah). Jeffrey also previously intended to join the United Malays National Organisation (UMNO), but his application was rejected.

Political career 
Pairin began his active political career in 1975. He was elected a Member of the Sabah Legislative Assembly for the Tambunan electorate in 1976 under the Sabah People's United Front (BERJAYA) party ticket, a party which was led by Harris Salleh (Chief Minister 1976–1985) and was appointed as a Minister in the cabinet of the ruling party. Tambunan has become his stronghold ever since.

Over time, Pairin became disillusioned with the party's leadership, and opposed some of the party's policies. He felt that the party had deviated from its original struggle. He however, remained firm with the party and subsequently, he was forced to leave the ruling party coalition in 1984.

Leadership 
In December 1984, he challenged as an Independent candidate against the ruling party to defend his seat in the Tambunan by-election. His leadership in a state within a federation which had the official religion of Islam, was also questioned because of his religion. Pairin easily won and defended his seat with significant majority.

In March 1985, Pairin formed Parti Bersatu Sabah (PBS). Despite overwhelming odds, he succeeded in registering PBS as a political party in the eleventh hour; thus paving the way for the party to contest against the incumbent state government in the 1985 Sabah state election in April.

PBS won a majority of 25 out of the 48 seats contested in the 1985 state elections. However, BERJAYA and the United Sabah National Organisation (USNO) joined forces submit their candidate as the chief minister, but after riots by BN followers, the newly formed coalition between BERJAYA and USNO was dissolved giving PBS the majority government. Pairin was sworn in as the seventh Chief Minister of the state of Sabah. He held the post of Sabah Chief Minister from April 1985 to March 1994, during which he spearheaded his party's triumphant outings in four successive state elections (1985, 1986, 1990 and 1994).

In the 1994 state election, PBS won the election, however shortly after being announced the winner, almost all PBS assemblymen defected to Barisan Nasional. Pairin was not allowed to be sworn in as Chief Minister. Tun Sakaran Dandai of UMNO was then sworn to be the eighth Chief Minister of Sabah.

On 6 June 2015, Pairin asserted a "clear connection of the incident to the 2015 Sabah earthquake that has brought about so much damage and loss of lives" by a group of European nude tourists on Mount Kinabalu 

Pairin is also the Huguan Siou or Paramount Leader of the Kadazan-Dusun community by virtue of being the president of the Kadazandusun Cultural Association (KDCA), the community's principal cultural association. However, there is a growing concern that Pairin is no longer suitable to hold the Huguan Siou title and that he should give way to the younger generation.

Honours

Honours of Malaysia
  :
  Commander of the Order of the Defender of the Realm (PMN) – Tan Sri (2010)
  :
  Grand Knight of the Order of Sultan Ahmad Shah of Pahang (SSAP) – Dato' Sri (1988)
  :
  Grand Commander of the Order of Kinabalu (SPDK) – Datuk Seri Panglima (1986)

Election results

See also 
 1991 Sabah political arrests
 Parti Bersatu Sabah (PBS) or United Sabah Party
 Kadazandusun Cultural Association (KDCA)

References 

1940 births
Living people
People from Sabah
Kadazan-Dusun people
Malaysian Christians
Malaysian Roman Catholics
20th-century Malaysian lawyers
Malaysian political party founders
United Sabah Party politicians
Sabah People's United Front politicians
Chief Ministers of Sabah
Sabah state ministers
Members of the Sabah State Legislative Assembly
Members of the Dewan Rakyat
University of Adelaide alumni
Commanders of the Order of the Defender of the Realm
Grand Commanders of the Order of Kinabalu
21st-century Malaysian politicians